Yegorovka-na-Medveditse is a rural locality (a selo) in Rudnyanskoye Urban Settlement, Rudnyansky District, Volgograd Oblast, Russia. The population was 47 as of 2010. There are 2 streets.

Geography 
Yegorovka-na-Medveditse is located in steppe, on the Medveditsa River, 57 km northeast of Rudnya (the district's administrative centre) by road. Melzavod is the nearest rural locality.

References 

Rural localities in Rudnyansky District, Volgograd Oblast